Sam Locke (born 11 August 1998) is a Scottish professional golfer. He came to prominence by winning the Silver Medal, as the leading amateur, at the 2018 Open Championship.

Amateur career
Locke won the 2017 Scottish Amateur beating Ryan Lumsden, 9 and 8, in the final, after being 10-up after the first 18 holes.

Locke qualified for the 2018 Open Championship by winning the Final Qualifying at The Renaissance Club with rounds of 69 and 66. He was the only amateur to qualify through Final Qualifying and joined three other amateurs in the field. He just made the cut, after rounds of 72 and 73, the only amateur to do so, and won the Silver Medal as the leading amateur after further rounds of 70 and 78. He turned professional after the Open Championship.

Amateur wins
2017 Scottish Amateur

Source:

Professional wins (3)

Tartan Pro Tour wins (3)

Results in major championships
Results not in chronological order before 2019.
 

LA = Low amateur
CUT = missed the half-way cut
"T" = tied for place

References

External links

Profile at Scottish Golf

Scottish male golfers
Sportspeople from Aberdeenshire
People from Stonehaven
1998 births
Living people